Ivan Kondev (born 29 January 1944) is a Bulgarian gymnast. He competed at the 1968 Summer Olympics and the 1972 Summer Olympics.

References

1944 births
Living people
Bulgarian male artistic gymnasts
Olympic gymnasts of Bulgaria
Gymnasts at the 1968 Summer Olympics
Gymnasts at the 1972 Summer Olympics
Sportspeople from Sliven